The badminton women's singles tournament at the 2016 Summer Olympics took place from 11 to 20 August at Riocentro - Pavilion 4. The seeding was decided on 21 July 2016.

The event was won by then two-time reigning world champion Carolina Marín of Spain who defeated P. V. Sindhu of India in the final. Nozomi Okuhara of Japan won the bronze medal after China's Li Xuerui was forced to withdraw. This was the first medal of any colour for Spain in Olympic badminton and this was also the first time that China failed to make to the podium since 1996.

Competition format 

The tournament started with a group phase round-robin followed by a knockout stage.

Seeds 
A total of 13 players were given seeds.

 (gold medalist)
 (quarter-finals)
 (fourth place)
 (round of 16)
 (group stage)
 (bronze medalist)
 (quarter-finals)

<li> (round of 16)
<li> (silver medalist)
<li>  (quarter-finals)
<li> (group stage)
<li> (quarter-finals)
<li>  (round of 16)

Results

Group stage

Group A

Group C

Group D

Group E

Group G

Group H

Group I

Group J

Group K

Group L

Group M

Group N

Group P

Knockout

1 The match was scratched and Okuhara was awarded the bronze medal as Xuerui was unable to compete due to suffering a torn anterior cruciate ligament (ACL) and lateral meniscus in her semi-final against Marín.

References 

Badminton at the 2016 Summer Olympics
Olymp
Women's events at the 2016 Summer Olympics